Jeffrey Charles Taffe (born February 19, 1981) is an American former professional ice hockey center. Taffe was drafted in the first round, 30th overall, by the St. Louis Blues in the 2000 NHL Entry Draft.

Playing career
After playing three seasons with the University of Minnesota, during which the Blues traded his rights to the Phoenix Coyotes in a deal involving Keith Tkachuk, Taffe made his professional debut with Coyotes' American Hockey League affiliate, the Springfield Falcons, in the 2002–03 season. He also appeared in 20 NHL games with the Coyotes that same season, scoring three goals.

Taffe spent the 2004-05 season as a member of the American Hockey League's Utah Grizzlies. On November 28, 2004, Taffe was involved in an on-ice incident where he elbowed Houston Aeros goalie Josh Harding in the back of Harding's neck, resulting in a grade two concussion to Harding.  Taffe was suspended for four games by the league.

Taffe appeared in 82 games over parts of three seasons with the Coyotes before being traded to the New York Rangers in exchange for Jamie Lundmark during the 2005–06 season. He appeared in two games with the Rangers, before being traded back to Phoenix later in the season in exchange for Martin Sonnenberg.

On July 13, 2007, Taffe signed a one-year contract with the Pittsburgh Penguins. After beginning the 2007–08 with the Wilkes-Barre/Scranton Penguins, Taffe was recalled to Pittsburgh and found a checking role on the fourth line. He remained on the team as a healthy scratch in the playoffs that year as Adam Hall was favored to fill Taffe's fourth line position.

After re-signing with the Penguins, Taffe played a handful of games with Pittsburgh during the 2008–09 season mainly playing in Wilkes-Barre. After Wilkes-Barre was eliminated from the AHL playoffs, Taffe was recalled for the Pittsburgh Penguins playoff run and eventual 2009 Stanley Cup Championship. He was on the practice squad but did not play in any games and so he did not qualify to be included on the Stanley.  However, Taffe and a number of other Wilkes-Barre players and healthy scratches took part in the on-ice celebration and team photo.  Taffe was also awarded a Stanley Cup Ring.

Taffe then signed a two-year, two-way deal with the Florida Panthers on July 3, 2009. At this point Taffe started to play very few NHL games and mostly played in the American Hockey League, receiving very few call-ups.

The Florida Panthers traded Jeff Taffe to the Chicago Blackhawks for Marty Reasoner on July 22, 2010. Taffe was assigned to Chicago's AHL affiliate, the Rockford IceHogs shortly before the 2010 NHL regular season began.

On July 3, 2011, Taffe signed a two-way contract with the Minnesota Wild. Taffe was familiarly assigned to the AHL, with affiliate the Houston Aeros. Through the duration of the 2011–12 season, Taffe was recalled by the Wild and appeared as a depth player in 5 games.

On July 2, 2012, Unable to earn a NHL contract due to the lockout, Taffe signed a one-year contract with the Hershey Bears of the AHL. During the 2012–13 season, Taffe led the Bears in scoring with 71 points in 73 games, for second overall in the AHL. In the penultimate regular season game, Taffe recorded his league leading 53rd assist in a 4-2 defeat to the Binghamton Senators for his 500th AHL point, on April 20, 2013. He was selected to the AHL Second All-Star Team at years end.

After 10 seasons of playing professionally in North America, Taffe signed his first contract abroad on a two-year deal with Swedish club Linköpings HC of the Swedish Hockey League on May 17, 2013. However just under two weeks later, citing personal reasons, Taffe was granted a release from his contract with Linköpings to remain in North America. With an amicable departure, Linköpings left the possibility open for a return at season's end.

With an additional year spent with the Hershey Bears and unable to reach the playoffs in the 2013–14 season, Taffe agreed to return to Linköpings and embark on his European career, signing a one-year contract on July 22, 2014. In the 2014–15 season, Taffe lived up to expectations, quickly adapted to produce at an elite rate of 59 points in only 54 games.

On April 7, 2015, Taffe left Sweden after the season to sign a lucrative one-year deal with Russian club, HC Neftekhimik Nizhnekamsk of the KHL. He returned for a second season in the KHL with HC Slovan Bratislava before continuing his journeyman career in signing a one-year contract with HC Ambrì-Piotta in the Swiss National League in August 2017.

As a free agent in the following off-season, Taffe opted to return to former club, HC Slovan Bratislava, in agreeing to a one-year deal on August 22, 2018.

Career statistics

Regular season and playoffs

International

Awards and honors

References

External links

1981 births
Living people
HC Ambrì-Piotta players
American men's ice hockey centers
Chicago Blackhawks players
Florida Panthers players
Hartford Wolf Pack players
Hershey Bears players
Houston Aeros (1994–2013) players
Ice hockey players from Minnesota
Linköping HC players
Minnesota Golden Gophers men's ice hockey players
Minnesota Wild players
National Hockey League first-round draft picks
HC Neftekhimik Nizhnekamsk players
New York Rangers players
People from Hastings, Minnesota
Phoenix Coyotes players
Pittsburgh Penguins players
Rochester Americans players
Rochester Mustangs players
Rockford IceHogs (AHL) players
St. Louis Blues draft picks
San Antonio Rampage players
HC Slovan Bratislava players
Springfield Falcons players
Utah Grizzlies (AHL) players
Wilkes-Barre/Scranton Penguins players
NCAA men's ice hockey national champions
American expatriate ice hockey players in Russia
American expatriate ice hockey players in Sweden
American expatriate ice hockey players in Slovakia
American expatriate ice hockey players in Switzerland